The Research Organization for Agriculture and Food (ORPP) is one of Research Organizations under the umbrella of the National Research and Innovation Agency (BRIN). The organization is transformation of Indonesian Agency for Agricultural Research and Development (Balitbangtan) of Ministry of Agriculture (Kementan). On 24 January 2022, it is announced that the organization expected to be formed on 1 February 2022. ORPP formation is finalized on 1 March 2022 and is functional since 4 March 2022 with inauguration of its first head, Puji Lestari.

Structure 
The structure of ORPP is as follows:

 Office of the Head of ORPP
 Research Center for Food Technology and Processing
 Research Center for Agroindustry
 Research Center for Food Crops
 Research Center for Horticulture and Estate Crops
 Research Center for Animal Husbandry
 Research Center for Appropriate Technology
 Research Groups

List of Heads

References 

Science and technology in Indonesia
Research institutes in Indonesia
2022 establishments in Indonesia
National Research and Innovation Agency